Qaleh-ye Musa Khan (also Romanized as Qal‘eh-ye Mūsá Khān and Qal‘eh Mūsá Khān; also known as Ghal‘eh Moosa Khan) is a village in Rezvaniyeh Rural District, in the Central District of Tiran and Karvan County, Isfahan Province, Iran. At the 2006 census, its population was 119, in 41 families.

References 

Populated places in Tiran and Karvan County